Xu Wang or Wang Xu may refer to:

Wang Xu (died 886), Chinese warlord of the Tang Dynasty
Wang Xu (wrestler) (born 1985),  Chinese freestyle wrestler
Xu Wang (athlete) (born 1990), Chinese long-distance runner